Páez is one of the seven municipalities (municipios) that makes up the Venezuelan state of Apure and, according to the 2011 census by the National Institute of Statistics of Venezuela, the municipality has a population of 100,125. The town of Guasdualito is the municipal seat of the Páez Municipality.

Name
The municipality is one of several in Venezuela named "Páez Municipality", for independence hero José Antonio Páez.

Demographics
The Páez Municipality, according to a 2007 population estimate by the National Institute of Statistics of Venezuela, has a population of 111,059 (up from 93,010 in 2000). This amounts to 23.4% of the state's population.

Government
The mayor of the Páez Municipality is José del Carmen Alvarado, re-elected November 23, 2008 with 76% of the vote. The municipality is divided into five parishes; Urbana Guasdualito, Aramendi, El Amparo, San Camilo, and Urdaneta.

References

Municipalities of Apure